Otaihanga railway station was a flag station  between Paraparaumu and Waikanae on the Wellington-Manawatu Line in New Zealand, when the line was run by the Wellington and Manawatu Railway Company.  This line is now part of the Kapiti section of the North Island Main Trunk.

The station was opened on 2 August 1886. The two ends of the line met at Otaihanga on 27 October, and the last spike was driven at a public ceremony by Governor William Jervois on 3 November 1886 before more than a thousand people. The first revenue-earning train, a stock train from Longburn to Johnsonville with 355 sheep and 60 head of cattle had run on 30 October. The last spike monument is now in the carpark at Southward Car Museum.

The station served Otaihanga, a then-rural area between Paraparaumu and Waikanae which is now mainly residential.

The platform was on the east side of the line according to Cassells, who shows a blind siding on the west side of the line with the south end joining the main line. The station had a waiting shed, and was two miles and nine chains (3.2 km) north of Paraparaumu.

A 1903 WMR advertisement says that the station will be closed from 30 May 1903. Two references say that the station closed in 1902, but neither give a date. Scoble says that the station closed in 1902. Hoy says that Otaihanga closed in 1902 or in "company days". A WMR newspaper advertisement of 12 November 1902 names the station as one of several stations (along with Khandallah, Tawa Flat, Pukerua and Hadfield) where certain trains would not stop (indicating that the station was still open on 12 November).

References

Citations

Bibliography

External links 
Otaihanga from the Cyclopaedia of New Zealand, 1897 
Photo of crowd at 1886 opening ceremony

Rail transport in Wellington
Defunct railway stations in New Zealand
Railway stations opened in 1886
Railway stations closed in 1903
Buildings and structures in the Kapiti Coast District